Sayula Popoluca, also called Sayultec, is a Mixe language spoken by around 5,000 indigenous people in and around the town of Sayula de Alemán in the southern part of the state of  Veracruz, Mexico.  Almost all published research on the language has been the work of Lawrence E. Clark of the Summer Institute of Linguistics.  More recent studies of Sayula Popoluca have been conducted by Dennis Holt (lexico-semantics) and Richard A. Rhodes (morphology and syntax), but few of their findings have been published.

Etymology 
Popoluca is the Castilian alteration of the Nahuatl word , meaning 'barbarians' or 'people speaking a foreign language'. In Mexico, the name Popoluca is a traditional name for various Mixe-Zoquean languages, and the name Popoloca is a traditional name for a totally unrelated language belonging to the Oto-Manguean languages.

Natively it is known as  'local language' or  'language of the home'.

Phonology

 is only found in Spanish loans.

Sayula vowels are short, long, and broken (i.e. glottalized, represented here as Vʔ).

There are two systems of orthography in the published literature.
 Clark (1961, 1995) uses some Spanish orthographic principles.  /h/ is spelled . /j/ is spelled . /ʔ/ is spelled . /ʃ/ is spelled . /tʃ/ is spelled . /k/ is spelled  before /i/ and /e/, and  elsewhere. Similarly /g/ is spelled  before /i/ and /e/, and  elsewhere. Syllable final /w/ is spelled . /ɨ/ is spelled . Vowel length is indicated by an underline. Unassimilated Spanish loans are spelled as in Spanish.
Length is spelled .

The orthography of Clark (1983) is used here.

Morphology
Sayula Popoluca verbs are inflected for person and number of subject and object, for aspect, and for the difference between independent and dependent.

Dependency is marked by the allomorphy of the aspect markers, as shown in the following paradigm.

Sayula Popoluca marks agreement in transitive clause in an inverse system (Tatsumi, 2013). Speech Act Participants (SAP) 1EXCL, 1INCL, and 2 outrank 3. There is a separate system in which a topical 3rd person (PROXIMATE) outranks a non-topical 3rd person (OBVIATIVE).  The pattern of person marking is given in Table I (adapted from Tatsumi, 2013:88).

Table I

The inverse system is also reflected in the form of the plural marker. In the case in which a higher ranking singular acts on a lower ranking plural, the plural marker is -kʉš-, elsewhere the plural is as in the singular, -ka-.  An example paradigm is given below:

Inversion affects  he allomorphy of both the person marking and the aspect marking (Clark (1961:195) with the result that the inverse forms have no distinct dependent form.

Notes

Bibliography
Clark, Lawrence E. 1959. "Phoneme classes in Sayula Popoluca." Studies in Linguistics 14:25-33.
Clark, Lawrence E. 1961. "Sayula Popoluca Texts, with Grammatical Outline". Linguistic Series, 6. Norman, Oklahoma: Summer Institute of Linguistics of the University of Oklahoma.
Clark, Lawrence E. 1962. "Sayula Popoluca Morpho-Syntax. ''International Journal of American Linguistics'' 28(3):183-198.
Clark, Lawrence E. 1977. "Linguistic Acculturation in Sayula Popoluca." ''International Journal of American Linguistics'' 43(2):128-138.
Clark, Lawrence E. 1983. "Sayula Popoluca Verb Derivation". Amerindian Series, 8. Dallas, Texas: Summer Institute of Linguistics.
Clark, Lawrence E. 1995. Vocabulario popoluca de Sayula: Veracruz, México. Serie de vocabularios y diccionarios indígenas "Mariano Silva y Aceves", 104. Tucson: Instituto Lingüístico de Verano.
Holt, Dennis. 1998. Review of Vocabulario popoluca de Sayula: Veracruz, México. By Lawrence E. Clark. Language 74.2:438-40.
Holt, Dennis. 2002. "Poemo Sayula Popoluca".  The Third Page. 
Sistema de Información Cultural, Government of Mexico. 26 January 2007. Mixe–popoluca de Oluta, Mixe–popoluca de Sayula
Tatsumi, Tomoko. 2013. Inversion in Sayula Popoluca. 言語研究（Gengo Kenkyu）144: 83–101.

Indigenous languages of Mexico
Mixe–Zoque languages
Endangered Mixe–Zoque languages

Languages of Mexico